Everett Bernard Ellin (1928–2011) was an American museum official, art dealer, engineer, lawyer, and talent agent.  As the first Executive Director of the Museum Computer Network, he played a key role in museums' adoption of computer technology to catalog their holdings.

Ellin was born on October 3, 1928 in Chicago, Illinois.  He studied at the University of Michigan, from which he received a bachelor's degree in engineering, and at Harvard Law School, from which he received a law degree in 1952.  He served in the Air Force during the Korean War, with duties that included drafting regulations regarding technological obsolescence.  After leaving the Air Force, he worked for a time as a lawyer, serving as a law clerk with the California Supreme Court and as in-house counsel at Columbia Pictures.   He also worked as an assistant to a William Morris Agency executive.

Urged by his then-girlfriend, painter Joan Jacobs, Ellin opened the Everett Ellin Gallery in 1957 on Santa Monica Boulevard in Los Angeles. He showed work by Jacobs and other California artists. In 1958, he closed the gallery and moved to New York, where he worked for blue-chip art and antiques gallery French and Company—it had recently started a contemporary art program, which was helmed by art critic Clement Greenberg. Ellin returned to Los Angeles and reopened his gallery on Sunset Boulevard in 1960, where it remained until 1963. The gallery hosted an exhibition of work by Niki de Saint-Phalle and Jean Tinguely in March 1962, along with the first American Action de Tir by Saint-Phalle in an alley off the Sunset Strip.

Ellin died of pneumonia on September 16, 2011.

References

External links 

 Finding aid for Everett Ellin papers, 1928-2013, Getty Research Institute, Los Angeles. Accession No. 2015.M.22. The papers document Ellin's professional life, including his work with the Everett Ellin Gallery, French & Company, and the Museum Computer Network. A small quantity of personal papers is also present.

1928 births
2011 deaths
Museum people
American art dealers
American engineers
American talent agents
Harvard Law School alumni
University of Michigan College of Engineering alumni
Deaths from pneumonia in the United States
20th-century American lawyers